Brandon Copeland may refer to:

 Brandon Copeland (linebacker), 1991, American football player
 Brandon Copeland (wide receiver), 1986, American football player